The Sony Xperia V is a smartphone designed, developed and marketed by Sony Mobile. Presented initially on 29 August 2012 in Berlin, the Xperia V belongs to Sony's handset line up of the second half of 2012, which includes the flagship  Xperia T and the entry-level Xperia J. The  device employs a 1280×720 (720p) pixel resolution display, a 1.5 GHz dual-core processor and a 13-megapixel camera, and an interchangeable battery while protected by a water-resistant outer skin. This is the first Sony Mobile's device alongside the Xperia J that does not feature the Sony Ericsson's liquid energy logo.

Availability
The device was officially announced by Sony on 29 August 2012 in Berlin along with the Xperia J and T. The device is water and dust resistant which is similar to the Xperia go and Xperia acro S. It was to be released during the fourth quarter of 2012. As of January 2015, Sony has run out of replacement batteries in Hong Kong and is no long producing them, meaning it is no longer supporting the Xperia V.

Hardware
The phone has a capacitive touchscreen display that measures 4.3 inches with a resolution of 1280 x 720 pixels at 342 ppi equipped with Sony's Mobile BRAVIA Engine 2 which enhances the display of the device. It is capable of displaying 16,777,216 colours and supports multitouch. The camera of the device has 13 megapixels capable of 16 times digital zoom with Sony's Exmor R for low light capturing. 

It is capable of video recording at 1080p HD and also video calling. The phone also features a VGA front-facing camera with 0.3 megapixels. The device has a 1.5 GHz Dual-core Qualcomm Snapdragon processor with 1 GiB RAM, internal storage of 8 GiB and an external slot for storage expansion up to 64 GiB. 

The device is also NFC (Near Field Communication) enabled which can be used with Xperia SmartTags, or for low value financial transactions, as NFC becomes more widespread in use, with the appropriate applications from Google Play. The device also features a micro USB connector with USB on the Go support It also has a scratch-resistant and shatterproof glass. Despite being equipped with a user-replaceable battery, the Xperia V has a dust- (IP5X) and water-resistant (IPX5/7) rating, similar to the Sony Xperia acro S.

Software
The phone is released with Sony's Android 4.0 Ice Cream Sandwich integrated with Facebook and the Entertainment Network, allowing users to access Music & Video Unlimited. Other than that, the device also has the Walkman music player with a manual equalizer and is DLNA certified.

The operating system can be upgraded to version 4.3 Jellybean from 29 January (see bottom of page), with it being the final version and no Android version 4.4 KitKat being released for Xperia V. 

Though Sony did not release any software updates after Jellybean 4.3, they have always been supporting open source nature of Android; as a result, there are lot of ROMs available. Recently it also received Lollipop-based ROMSs which include cyanogenmod,paranoid android thanks to developers at XDA.

References

External links
 Sony Xperia V official webpage

Android (operating system) devices
Mobile phones introduced in 2012
Discontinued smartphones
V
Mobile phones with user-replaceable battery